Jafar, meaning in Arabic "small stream/rivulet/creek", is a masculine Arabic given name, common among Muslims especially Arabs

It may also be transliterated Jafar, Jaffar, Jafer, Jaffer, Jafur or, in Egyptian Arabic pronunciation, Gafar. 

The Turkish spelling of the name is Cafer, the Azerbaijani Cəfər, the Bosniak Džafer and the Albanian Xhafer.

Historical persons
Ja'far ibn Abi Talib (died 629), companion of Muhammad, older brother of Ali 
Jafar ibn Ali, son of Ali and Umm ul-Banin
Ja'far al-Sadiq (702–765), descendant of Ali, sixth imam of Shia Islam
Ja'far ibn Yahya (767–803), one of the Barmakids, vizier of Caliph Harun al-Rashid
 Ja'far al-Mutawakkil (822–861), the tenth Abbasid caliph
Abu Ma'shar Jaʿfar ibn Muhammad al-Balkhi (787–886), Persian scholar
Mir Jafar (1691–1765), military commander who betrayed the Nawab of Bengal Siraj ud-Daulah
Mir Jafar Dasni (died 841), a rebel, who rebelled against Abbasid caliph al-Mu'tasim
Ja'far ibn Mansur al-Yaman (fl. 10th century), Ismaili theologian
Ja'far ibn Fallah (died 971), Kutama Berber general of the Fatimids
Ja'far ibn al-Furat (921–1001), Ikhshidid and Fatimid vizier
Jafar ibn Ali al-Hadi (c.840-c.885), son of the tenth imam of Twelver Shia Islam, Ali al-Hadi,anda founder of the Ja'fariyya sect
Ja'far ibn Muhammad al-Hasani (died 876/7), first Sharif of Mecca
 Ja'far al-Mufawwid, Abbasid prince and heir-apparent of Caliph al-Mu'tamid
 Ja'far al-Muqtadir (895-832), the eighteenth Abbasid caliph
Ja'far ibn Sa'id (died 1764/5), Sharif of Mecca
Jafar Khan (died 1789), King of Persia

Modern persons

Given name

Jafar
Jafar Alam, Bangladeshi politician and Member of Parliament
Jafar Alizadeh (born 1956), Iranian wrestler
Jafar Arias (born 1995), Curaçaoan footballer
Jafar al-Askari (1887–1936), prime minister of Iraq
Jafar Bazri, (born 1987), Iranian footballer
Jafar Bolhari (born 1948), Iranian psychiatrist
Jafar Ebrahimi, Iranian poet
Jafar al-Hakim (born 1965), Shiite Ayatollah in Najaf, Iraq
Jafar Iqbal, Bangladeshi footballer
Jafar Irismetov (born 1976), Uzbekistan footballer and coach
Jafar Jabbarli (1899–1934), Azerbaijani playwright, poet, director and screenwriter
Jafar Dhia Jafar (born 1943), Iraqi nuclear physicist
Jafar Khan Jamali (1911–1967), Indian politician, tribal chief and an All-India Muslim League veteran from Balochistan 
Jafar Kazemi, Iranian political prisoner sentenced to death and hanged for co-operation with the Iranian opposition group PMOI
Jafar Khan (died 1789), shah of Persia (1785–1789)
Jafar Mokhtarifar, Iranian footballer 
Jafar Mondal (born 1999), Indian footballer
Jafar Panahi (born 1960), Iranian filmmaker
Jafar Salmasi (1918–2000), Iranian weightlifter
Jafar Shafaghat (c.1915–2000), Iranian General officer in the Iranian Pahlavi Army
Jafar Shahidi (1918–2008), scholar of Persian language and literature and historian of Islam
Jafar Sharif-Emami (1910–1998), Prime minister of Iran
Jafar Shojouni, Iranian Shia cleric and politician who served a member of the Parliament of Iran 
Jafar Tabrizi (also known as Farīd al-Dīn and Qeblat al-Kottāb), 15th century master in calligraphy as well as a poet and scribe
Jafar Umar Thalib (1961–2019), Indonesian ulama and Islamic political figure
Jafar Towfighi (born 1956), Iranian engineer and politician
Jafar Zafarani (born 1947), Iranian mathematician

Ja'far
Ja'far Kashfi, Persian philosopher of 19th century
Ja'far Pishevari (1893-1947), Iranian politician
Ja'afar Touqan (born 1938), Palestinian-Jordanian architect
Tuanku Ja’afar, the tenth Yang di-Pertuan Agong (King) of Malaysia from 26 April 1994 until 25 April 1999 and the tenth Yang Di-Pertuan Besar (Ruler) of Negeri Sembilan

Jaffar
Jaffar Idukki, Indian impressionist and actor in Malayalam film
Jaffer Zaidi, Pakistani musician and lead vocalist of the Pakistani band Kaavish

Jaffer
Jaffer Rahimtoola (1870-1914), Indian barrister

Cafer
 Cafer Bater, Turkish politician
 Cafer Tayyar Eğilmez, Turkish politician
Džafer
Džafer Kulenović (1891–1956), Yugoslav politician who led the Yugoslav Muslim Organization in the Kingdom of Yugoslavia, and was briefly government minister

Gaafar
Gaafar Nimeiry (1930-2009), President of Sudan

Xhafer
Xhafer Bej Ypi (1880–1940), Albanian politician 
Xhafer Deva (1904–1978), Kosovo Albanian politician 
Xhafer Spahiu (born 1923), Albanian politician

Middle name
Abdul Halim Jaffer Khan (1927–2017), Indian sitar player
C. K. Jaffer Sharief or Challakere Kareem Jaffer Sharief (1933–2018), Indian politician
Mir Jafar Baghirov (1896–1956), Azerbaijani communist leader under the Soviet rule
Akif Jafar Hajiyev (1937–2015), Azerbaijani mathematician
Mufti Jafar Hussain, Pakistani Shia mujtahid and political leader
Seyyed Jafar Kashfi, Iranian calligrapher
Mohammad Jafar Mahallati, Iranian scholar of Islamic studies and a former diplomat
Mohammad Jafar Mahjoub (1924-1996), Iranian scholar of Persian literature, essayist, translator and teacher
Mohammad Jafar Montazeri (born 1949), Iranian cleric and judge and the current Attorney-General of Iran
Mohammad Jafar Moradi (born 1990), Iranian long distance runner
Sayed Jafar Naderi (born 1965), ethnic Hazara-Ismaili who controlled Baghlan Province of Afghanistan during the early 1990s
Mustafa Jaffer Sabodo, Tanzanian economist, consultant and businessman
Mohammad Jafar Yahaghi (born 1947), Persian writer, literary critic, editor and translator

Surname or patronymic
Jafar
Adnan Jafar (born 1949), Iraqi footballer 
Badr Jafar (born 1979), Emirati business executive
Jafar Dhia Jafar (born 1943), Iraqi nuclear physicist
Majid Jafar (born 1976), UAE businessman
Mustapha Ben Jafar (born 1940), Tunisian politician and doctor
Syed Jafar, Indian-American electrical engineer and computer scientist

Jaafar
Onn Jaafar (1895–1962), Malay politician and a Menteri Besar (Chief Minister) of Johor in Malaysia, then Malaya
Raja Jaafar Raja Muda (crown prince) of Perak Darul Ridzuan

Jaffar
Said Mohamed Jaffar (1918–1993), president of the State of Comoros

Jaffer
Armaan Jaffer (born 1998), Indian cricketer
Jameel Jaffer, Canadian human rights and civil liberties attorney
Melissa Jaffer (born 1936), Australian actress
Mobina Jaffer (born 1949), Canadian Senator
Mulla Asgarali Jaffer, leader of the Khoja Shia Athnā‘ashariyyah Community
Murtz Jaffer, Canadian celebrity journalist
Rahim Jaffer (born 1971), Canadian politician
Sadaf Jaffer (born 1983), American politician and scholar
Sayed Mohammed Jaffer (born 1985), Bahraini footballer
Wasim Jaffer (born 1978), Indian cricketer

Džaferović
Vanja Džaferović (born 1983), Croat-Bosnian footballer

Gaafar
Ahmed Gaafar (born 1985), Egyptian footballer
Farouk Gaafar (born 1952), Egyptian footballer
Mostafa Gaafar (born 1981), Egyptian footballer

Derived names
 Umm Ja'far
 Zubaidah bint Ja'far, (died 831) also known as Umm Ja'far was an Arab Abbasid princess, wife of caliph Harun al-Rashid (r. 786–809) and mother of caliph al-Amin (r. 809–813)
 Umm Ja'far Shuja, (died 861) was the mother of Abbasid caliph al-Mutawakkil
 Shaghab, (died 933) also known as Umm Ja'far was the mother of 10th-century Abbasid caliph al-Muqtadir

Fictional characters
Jaffar, a character in The Thief of Bagdad (1940 film)
Jafar (Disney), the main antagonist (inspired by the character in The Thief of Bagdad) in the 1992 Disney animated film Aladdin, its first sequel, The Return of Jafar, and its 2019 live-action remake
Jafar, one of the primary antagonists in Once Upon a Time in Wonderland, based on the Aladdin character
Ja'far, the main protagonist in the musical Twisted, based on the Aladdin character
Jaffar, a character in Prince of Persia, inspired by the character in The Thief of Bagdad
Jaffar, a character in the video game Fire Emblem: The Blazing Blade
Ja'far, a character in the manga Magi: The Labyrinth of Magic
Zafar, a character in the television show Aladdin - Naam Toh Suna Hoga inspired from the character of the grand vizir in Disney's Aladdin

See also
Khawlah bint Ja'far, one of the wives of the fourth Muslim Caliph Ali ibn Abi Talib
Zubaidah bint Ja`far, granddaughter of the Abbasid caliph Al-Mansur, through his son Ja'far, a wife of Harun al-Rashid
Jifar (name), Ethiopian variant of the name
Jaffa

References

Arabic masculine given names
Bosniak masculine given names